Eduard Wilhelmus Vincent Maria Hoeks (born November 9, 1952) is a Dutch diplomat. He is the current Ambassador of the Kingdom of the Netherlands in Ukraine.

Education 
Eduard Hoeks finished his studies at the University of Amsterdam in 1977, Political and Social Sciences (international relations and international law; Cum Laude.).

Diplomatic career
Started to work for the Ministry of Foreign Affairs in 1978 and was posted at the Embassies of the Kingdom of the Netherlands in Nairobi, Sofia, Moscow, Dhaka, Algiers, Ouagadougou and Jakarta. He also worked at the Ministry of Foreign Affairs in The Hague. Furthermore, he hold the following positions: Head of the Eastern European division (1996-2000); NATO Political Advisor SFOR Commander, Sarajevo (2000–01); He was consul-General of the Kingdom of the Netherlands in Ho Chi Minh City (2001–04); He was consul-General of the Kingdom of the Netherlands in Saint Petersburg (2004–08); He was ambassador of the Kingdom of the Netherlands in Luxembourg (2008–12); He was ambassador of the Kingdom of the Netherlands in Prague (2012-2017); From 2017 he is Ambassador of the Kingdom of the Netherlands in Kyiv.

References 

1952 births
Living people
21st-century Dutch diplomats
Ambassadors of the Netherlands to Ukraine
Ambassadors of the Netherlands to Luxembourg
20th-century Dutch diplomats